Molecular Membrane Biology is a peer-reviewed scientific journal that publishes review articles of biomembranes at the molecular level. It is published by Taylor & Francis. The editor-in-chief is Vincent Postis.

External links
 

Publications established in 1978
Molecular and cellular biology journals
Taylor & Francis academic journals
English-language journals
Annual journals